Biswanath Somadder (born 15 December 1963) is an Indian Judge. Presently, he is Chief Justice of Sikkim High Court. He is former Chief Justice of Meghalaya High Court. He is also former Judge of Allahabad High Court and Calcutta High Court. He has also served as Acting Chief Justice of the Calcutta High Court.

Early life and education
Somadder was born on 15 December 1963. He completed his schooling from the La Martiniere for Boys school, Calcutta. He then passed his Bachelor of Arts and LL.B. from the University of Calcutta and also completed a Certificate Course on Office Automation Tools under the Computer Education Programme of the Regional Computer Centre, Kolkata.

Career
Somadder was enrolled as an Advocate on 21 July 1989. He practised in the High Court at Calcutta as well as the Supreme Court of India and also appeared before CESTAT, Eastern Regional Bench. Somadder practised in Constitutional (Customs & Central Excise, FERA, Telecommunication, Education, Service and Income Tax), Arbitration, Company, Revenue, Civil and Criminal matters, and specialised in Revenue, Arbitration and Constitutional laws. Somadder was Senior Counsel for the Central Government in the High Court at Calcutta and was also the Hony. Joint Secretary of the Bar Library Club of Calcutta High Court, till just prior to his elevation.

On 22 June 2006, he was elevated as a permanent Judge of the Calcutta High Court. Justice Somadder was appointed the Executive Chairman of the State Legal Services Authority of West Bengal on 5 November 2018. Appointed Judge-in-Charge, Administrative Department, High Court at Calcutta, to discharge the functions assigned under the Appellate Side Rules of the High Court at Calcutta, with effect from 19 November 2018. He became the Acting Chief Justice of the Calcutta High Court from 1 January 2019 and retained the post till 3 April 2019.  He assumed charge as Judge of the Allahabad High Court on 17 October 2019.
On 23 April 2020, he was appointed the Chief Justice of Meghalaya High Court and took oath on 27 April 2020. He was transferred as Chief Justice of Sikkim High Court on 9 October 2021 and took oath on 12 October 2021.

References

1963 births
Living people
Indian judges
Judges of the Calcutta High Court
21st-century Indian judges
21st-century Indian lawyers
University of Calcutta alumni
Indian Senior Counsel
Judges of the Allahabad High Court
Judges of the Meghalaya High Court